The PlayStation VR2 (PS VR2) is a virtual reality headset for the PlayStation 5 home video game console developed by Sony Interactive Entertainment released on February 22, 2023.

History
Development of PS VR2 took about six years, and was developed simultaneously alongside the PlayStation 5, with the goal to craft the perfect match of a console and a virtual reality device.

Leading up to the PS VR2 release, a display analyst from the Display Supply Chain Consultants (DSCC), said that he expect the upcoming next generation VR headset to have a display with the highest pixel density on a commercial OLED panel, with pixel density "well above 800 PPI".

At the 2022 Consumer Electronics Show, Sony announced the PlayStation VR2 for the PlayStation 5.

A release date of February 22, 2023, and a retail price of $549.99 was announced on November 2, 2022 at the official PlayStation Blog.

Prior to release, a Bloomberg report said that Sony has reduced its projections for the initial launch after early pre-orders disappointment. Sony refuted the report, and told GamesIndustry.biz that "it is seeing enthusiasm from PlayStation fans for the upcoming launch".

Hardware 
The headset connects to the PlayStation 5 console through a single USB-C cable, which enables a simple plug and play design. The cable length is 4.5m (14.7 ft). Sony stated that while they are still researching the technical possibility of a wireless connection, due to concerns about its impact on performance, they chose to go with the cable solution.

The PS VR2 has dual OLED panel with a 4K display resolution and 90Hz/120Hz frame rate. Each display has a resolution of 2,000 x 2,040 pixels. The display also supports HDR.

The headset uses fresnel lenses. These lenses "act on microscopic level to significantly reduce ghosting" and "allow for a beautiful image without sacrificing brightness". 

Compared to the first generation PS VR, the headset overall weight has been reduced, while the headband underwent many design improvements to increase its comfort. The FOV was also increased to approx. 110 degrees.

Unlike the first generation PlayStation VR, which tracked player movements through an external PlayStation Camera, the PS VR2 tracks movements by four cameras mounted on the headset. The headset tracking cameras are also used to track the controllers, and to give video feed for the "see-through view" feature, which allows the user to view their surroundings without needing to take off the headset.

The headset also has two inward-facing IR cameras. It is used for eye-tracking to enable games to utilize foveated rendering, a performance optimization technique where the render resolution of the game is reduced in areas where the player is not looking. The eye-tracking can also be used for other purposes, like providing an additional input method for the game with a simple look in a specific direction.

PS VR2 has a new lens adjustment dial, which allows the headset to accommodate different IPD measurements. The lightshield of the headset was also designed to be able to accommodate different head shapes and nose sizes, and it can be removed from the PS VR2 headset to get cleaned using water.   

PS VR2 also features a headset feedback through a built-in motor, which provides subtle haptic effects for added immersion, like feeling the character heartbeat or feeling the rush of objects passing close to the head. Some sources have pointed out that Sony have previously registered patents which mentioned using haptics to reduce motion sickness. 

Additionally, PS VR2 headset has a cooling system that incorporates a duct and a small fan to cool the onboard IC chip. In addition to cooling the IC chip, this airflow also provides ventilation to help minimize the lenses fogging up while the player is wearing the headset.

The headset has built-in microphone and stereo headphone jack. Using the PS5 "Tempest 3D AudioTech", the headset supports 3D audio through headphones, while also allowing the in-game audio to dynamically adapts to the user position and head movements.

PS VR2 introduces the new Sense controllers. The controller was designed with a focus on balancing the center of gravity and reducing weight, while also maintaining comfort and incorporating new features. The controller is shaped like an "orb or hollowed-out sphere", which is used to ideally place a ring of 14 IR LEDs that is used for tracking its position and orientation. The controller has several features, including key features from the DualSense controller, like haptic feedback and the adaptive triggers technology. Another new feature is the finger touch detection, which can detect the approximate location of the fingers, enabling the user to make a more natural gestures during gameplay. This is achieved by using five capacitive finger touch sensors on each controller (four sensors for each button, and one sensor for the analog stick) to detect the placements of the thumb, index, and the middle finger.

Similar to the original PS VR, the new PS VR2 also features a Social Screen, which allows others to see what the player is experiencing in a 2D format on a TV screen. Cinematic Mode is also supported, which is used to view all non-VR game and media contents on a virtual cinema screen.

The play area for PS VR2 can be customized using the cameras and the Sense controller. There are three different "VR Play Styles" depending on the game content and compatibility : 1-Sitting, 2-Standing or 3-Roomscale (the last one allowing more movement while playing).

Games and content
More than 100 games are in development for PS VR2 according to Sony, with more than 40 games available at the launch window, including Resident Evil Village, The Walking Dead: Saints & Sinners – Chapter 2: Retribution, No Man's Sky, Star Wars: Tales from the Galaxy's Edge, Demeo, Moss 1 & 2 remasters, and PS VR2 exclusives Horizon Call of the Mountain and The Dark Pictures: Switchback VR. Gran Turismo 7 and Beat Saber are also coming to PS VR2.

Gran Turismo 7 was also confirmed to have a full game support on the PS VR2 (except for the 2-player splitscreen mode). This is in contrast to the previous game in the series, Gran Turismo Sport, which was only supported by the original PS VR headset in a very limited capacity.

PS VR2 is not compatible with the previous generation PS VR games. Sony said that due to the differences in both the controller tracking hardware and the image rendering principle, porting games from the previous hardware would not be easy. It was later reported that many developers are working to upgrade their PS VR games for the PS VR2 system.

According to multiple sources, during a Sony developers conference, Sony told the developers that it wants to focus on "hybrid" VR games for the upcoming headset, much like the PSVR-optional games such as Hitman 3, Resident Evil 7 and No Man’s Sky.

Reception
Early previews have been positive. Pre-release reviews were mostly positive, lauding the many improvements over its predecessor and its advanced technology. The lack of backward compatibility and the price of the headset received mixed reaction. Various game developers praised the capabilities of the headset, particularly in combination with the Playstation 5. The new Sense controllers received acclaim from CNET, while Eurogamer singled out the HDR OLED screen for its brightness and contrast, stating that "it now feels more comparable to a proper high-end OLED TV". Some reviewers criticized the inconvenience of the wired connection. While the launch library was described as "solid" by CNN, The Telegraph had some concerns about future first party software plans beyond the current offering. 

On Metacritic, out of 51 professional critic reviews, 14 were in the "Extremely positive" reviews, 33 in the "Positive" reviews, 4 in the "Mixed" reviews, and 0 in the "Negative" reviews.

In regards to the software, previews of the exclusive title Gran Turismo 7 were overwhelmingly positive, with Motorsport.com describing it as "the best console virtual reality experience to date".

Reference

External links
Official website
PlayStation VR2 on VRcompare

 
Computer peripherals
Products introduced in 2022
Virtual reality headsets
Video game console add-ons